Pedakapavaram is a village in the mandal of Akividu in the West Godavari district of the state of Andhra Pradesh in southern India.

Geography

It is situated within the designated area of the famous Kolleru Lake bird sanctuary.
 
In recent years there has been significant flooding in the surrounding area, which local farmers believe is the result of poor management of illegal fishing practices on the lake itself.

Demographics 

 Census of India, Pedapakavaram had a population of 4440. The total population constitute, 2203 males and 2237 females with a sex ratio of 1015 females per 1000 males. 426 children are in the age group of 0–6 years, with sex ratio of 945 The average literacy rate stands at 72.30%.

References

Villages in West Godavari district